Olympic Boulevard (formerly 10th Street) is a major arterial road in Los Angeles, California.  It stretches from Ocean Avenue on the western end of Santa Monica to East Los Angeles—farther than Wilshire Boulevard and most other streets.

Its path runs parallel to and north of Pico Boulevard from Santa Monica to Downtown Los Angeles, and parallel to and south of Santa Monica Boulevard on its western end and Wilshire Boulevard past Beverly Hills.

Like other major Los Angeles streets, Olympic is at least four lanes in width. Unlike other east-west arterial roads such as Wilshire Boulevard, Santa Monica Boulevard, and Sunset Boulevard, it does not cross   major attractions and sites and therefore contains far less traffic. While Wilshire crosses through the heart of Los Angeles, Olympic runs through the southern end of principal areas such as West Los Angeles, Westwood, Century City, Beverly Hills, Hancock Park, Koreatown, Westlake and Downtown Los Angeles. Little Ethiopia is east of Fairfax Avenue and Olympic. Proceeding east on Olympic, it breaks off in Downtown LA's Fashion District but continues on from there, passing the southern areas of Boyle Heights, East Los Angeles, Commerce, and Montebello with an eastern terminus in Pico Rivera as a small neighborhood street.

Olympic Boulevard is primarily a commercial, urban street. There is a grass divider with trees in the Santa Monica portion. Around Carthay, Olympic passes through residential neighborhoods. A number of schools are located on Olympic as well. Crossroads School is located at Olympic and 20th in Santa Monica, New Roads Middle School is located at the Franklin/Berkeley St. area in Santa Monica. and Wildwood School is located in between Bundy and Barrington. Los Angeles High School is located slightly to the east of Olympic and Highland Avenue.

Even so, due to Los Angeles traffic, Olympic often becomes congested.

It was originally named 10th Street, but was renamed Olympic Boulevard for the 1932 Summer Olympics, as that was the occasion of the tenth modern event.  Tenth Street School, at Olympic and Grattan, was founded in 1888 and has kept the original name. Parts of the old 10th Street exist as smaller streets near Hancock Park, in Westlake, and in the Central City East area southeast of Downtown.

Transportation

Bus service throughout Olympic Boulevard is served between Santa Monica and Century City by Santa Monica Transit line 5, between Century City and Downtown LA by Metro Local line 28, and from The Fashion District east by Metro Local lines 62 and 66.

There are two rail stations on the Metro E Line that stop on or near Olympic Boulevard: one on 26th Street in Santa Monica outside the Bergamot Station and another slightly south of Olympic Boulevard at Bundy Drive.

Notable landmarks
 Federal Reserve Bank of San Francisco, Los Angeles Branch
 The Grammy Museum
 LA Live
 Loyola Law School
 Sammy Lee Square, at the corner of Normandie Avenue
 Los Angeles High School
 National Academy of Recording Arts and Sciences headquarters

See also
Byron B. Brainard (1894–1940), Los Angeles City Council member who accessed state money for the widening of the boulevard.

References

Streets in Los Angeles
Streets in Santa Monica, California
Boulevards in the United States
Central Los Angeles
Downtown Los Angeles
Eastside Los Angeles
Westside (Los Angeles County)
Boyle Heights, Los Angeles
Century City, Los Angeles
Montebello, California
Rancho Park, Los Angeles
South Park (Downtown Los Angeles)
West Los Angeles
Westlake, Los Angeles